Mark Gonzales (born June 1, 1968), also known as "Gonz" and "The Gonz", is an American professional skateboarder and artist. He is known as the godfather of modern street skateboarding and was named the "Most Influential Skateboarder of All Time" by the Transworld Skateboarding magazine in December 2011.

Early life
Gonzales was born and raised in South Gate, California, United States, and is of Mexican descent.

Professional skateboarding
Gonzales entered the skateboarding scene at the age of thirteen in South Gate, California, U.S. At the age of fifteen, as Tommy Guerrero and Natas Kaupas were developing their own styles of progressive street skating around the same time, Gonzales adopted a more modern, innovative approach to skateboarding in a street context (subsequently dubbed "street skateboarding"). He was featured on the cover of Thrasher magazine's November 1984 issue riding a board from the Alva company, his board sponsor at the time, while performing a trick known as a "beanplant".

Vision to ATM Click
Shortly after his Thrasher magazine cover, Gonzales then joined the Vision skateboard team and entered his first contest as a professional in May 1985 at the 'Sacto Streetstyle Contest' held in Sacramento, California.  Soon after turning pro, Gonzalez won the 1985 'NSA Sure-Grip Beach Style' contest held adjacent to the pier in Oceanside, California.

Gonzales proceeded to further influence the progression of street skateboarding with the 1991 Blind Skateboards video Video Days (a company he formed with Steve Rocco in 1989).

Gonzales left Blind after experiencing frustrations that were similar to his time with Vision and then started another company called ATM Click and followed it with a venture with Ron Chatman called 60/40 who sponsored future Menace skaters Fabian Alomar and Joey Suriel. In 1993, Gonzales created controversy after he appropriated a Vision design that was used for one of his signature model boards for an ATM Click design; Gonzales then proceeded to also use the graphic for Real and Krooked signature skateboard models following his move to Deluxe Distribution.

Deluxe Distribution
Under the Deluxe Distribution company, Gonzales skated for Real Skateboards and appeared in three of the company's videos: Kicked Out of Everywhere, Non Fiction, and Real to Reel. In 2002, Gonzales then launched Krooked Skateboards in partnership with the Deluxe company and, as of February 2016, Krooked is an operational company that has released four full-length videos.

In 2007, Gonzales appeared in the skateboarding video game EA Skate and filmed a commercial to promote the game's release.

Sponsorship
As of 2013, Gonzales was sponsored by adidas, Krooked, Spitfire, Independent, and Supreme. In 2016, Gonzales joined the Pro-Tec skate team.

Influence
In the summer of 1986 Gonzales performed an ollie from one wall down to another platform at The Embarcadero in San Francisco, U.S. and the obstacle had been known as the "Gonz Gap" since his completion of the trick; the trick also helped to popularize The Embarcadero as a location for skateboarding. Later that year, Gonzales - along with fellow progressive street skater Natas Kaupas - was the first person to skate handrails. Gonzales was also the first person to ollie the Wallenberg Set, a four-block, nineteen feet-long, four feet-tall gap in San Francisco, California, US.

In reference to the early era of street skateboarding, professional skateboarder Mike Vallely stated in a 2007 interview: "At the time, the best street skaters in the world were Mark Gonzales, Jesse Martinez, Tommy Guerrero, who all three were Mexican kids, and Natas Kaupas, who was a Lithuanian dude that lived at the beach in Santa Monica." In an interview for the Adidas website, Gonzales explained in reply to a question about his influence with the Blind company, "I wanted to work with my big brother doing construction—at the time I felt old, but had a young chick."

In 2006 Gonzales was awarded the Legend Award by Transworld Skateboarding, and the magazine selected him as the most influential skateboarder of all time (followed by Tony Hawk and Rodney Mullen) in December 2011.

Art and writing
London-based art curator Emma Reeves has explained in an introduction that she wrote for Interview magazine: "He makes art all the time, and he has been making art in some form or another for almost as long as he has been skateboarding. But it's rare to see an actual show of the work". An interview that Reeves completed with Gonzales is also published in Interview and he reveals that he likes creating "zines" the most, as "it is the most free thing to do". In 2008, Drag City released a book called The Collected Fanzines that consists of reproductions of old zines that he created together with director Harmony Korine.

Gonzales was featured in the music video for the song "West Coast" by Jason Schwartzman's band, Coconut Records; the music video featured a sequence that was originally filmed in 1998 at a German museum, but was edited for the purpose of the music video with Gonzales' permission. Gonzales also directed and appears in the Coconut Records music video "Any Fun", alongside actress Chloë Sevigny and skateboarder Alex Olson.

Gonzales is also a poet and author, and his published body of work includes Social Problems, High Tech Poetry, Broken Dreams, and Broken Poems. Gonzales has revealed that he is constantly writing poetry.

In 2011, Gonzales designed and painted the London Flagship Supreme (brand) Store. Gonzales would send letters to the New York store entitled “Supream” during the early years of the brand. This led to many collaborations with Gonzales and Supreme, with the latest being in the S/S21 collection. Gonzales has designed sculptures and paintings for Supreme's retail locations in New York (Manhattan), San Francisco, London, Paris, Tokyo (Shibuya), Nagoya, and Osaka.

Personal life
As of 2018, Gonzales resides in New York City, New York with his wife, Tia, and their 2 children.

Filmography
The following is a list of films in which Gonzales appears:

How They Get There (1992)
Gummo (1997) – he appears in a scene in which he wrestles a chair
Southlander (2003) Gonzales plays Vince, a good friend of the main character
Beautiful Losers (2008) – a film about contemporary art and street culture (released on August 2, 2008)

Videography
Sure -Grip Beach Style (1985)
NSA 86' Vol. 4 (1986)
Mondo Vision (1987)
Thrasher (magazine): Savannah Slamma (1987)
Psycho Skate (1987)
Ohio Skateout (1988)
All Pro Mini Ramp Jam Hawaiian Style (1989)
Blind: Video Days (1991) 
Thrasher (magazine): The Truth Hurts (1993)
Supreme (brand): A Love Supreme (1995)
Deluxe: Jim's Ramp Jam (1996)
Real: Non-Fiction (1997) 
Deluxe: World Wide Distribution (1999)
Real: Kicked Out of Everywhere (1999) 
Real: Real To Reel (2001) 
411VM: Vancouver 2002 (2002)
Streets: San Francisco (2003)
Closure (2003)
Thrasher (magazine): Rocket Science (2004)
ON Video: Winter 2004 (2004)
Fourstar: Super Champion Funzone (2005) 
Fourstar: Catalog Shoot (2005)
Get Familiar (2006) 
McBeth - Mark Gonzales - The Journal (2006)
Krooked: Kronichles (2006)
Krooked: Gnar Gnar – the production was shot with an old VHS camcorder and was limited to 1000 VHS copies (2007) 
Adidas: A Five Day Excursion To Paris (2008)
Krooked: Naughty (2008)
Adidas: Diagonal (2009)
Fourstar: Gang of Fourstar (2009)
Krooked: Krook3D (2010)
Poweredge: We Are Skateboarders (2012) 
Transworld: The Cinematographer Project (2012)
Supreme (brand): Cherry (2014)
Adidas : "Away Days" (2016)

Gonzales also appeared in the 29th part of the web series "7 Day Weekend", produced by professional skateboarder Dustin Dollin—in the episode the pair skateboard, drink beer and converse while in France.

References

External links
Deluxe Distribution

Mark Gonzales - YouTube channel
1985 Mark Gonzalez Interview EDO Skate Zine; Springfield, VA / archive.org

American skateboarders
Living people
1968 births
People from South Gate, California
Sportspeople from Los Angeles County, California
Sportspeople from New York City
Artist skateboarders
American artists of Mexican descent
American sportspeople of Mexican descent